Detroit station, also known as Baltimore Street station, is an intermodal transit station in Detroit, Michigan. It currently serves Amtrak. It also serves as a stop for Greyhound Lines, Detroit Department of Transportation buses, Suburban Mobility Authority for Regional Transportation buses and QLine streetcars. It is located at the southwest corner of Woodward and West Baltimore avenues in the New Center area. Amtrak's Wolverine line serves an elevated platform at the main building, while the QLine serves an adjacent platform on Woodward Avenue.

History

Amtrak station

The Michigan Department of Transportation (MDOT) bought the 3.1 acre site of the station for $889,000 – which also includes land directly across the tracks – in 1994 from General Motors. The station was built in 1994 as a replacement for the former Michigan Central Station, which closed in 1988. From the closure of that station in 1988 until the new stations opening in 1994, services used a platform on Rose Street close to the old station.

The station consists of a one-story building which includes a waiting room, ticket office, and restrooms.  The platform is accessible by a tower at the back of the building, which heads to the level of the elevated GTW Shore Line Subdivision railway.

QLine
The streetcar system, now known as QLine, opened for service on May 12, 2017, and service began for the Baltimore Street station the same day. The station is sponsored by Penske. It is heated and features security cameras and emergency phones. Passenger amenities include Wi-Fi and arrival signs.

Future
In the mid-2000s, MDOT began working with local and federal agencies to develop an intermodal transit center one block south of the current station bounded by the Conrail North Yard Branch railway to the north, Woodward to the east, Amsterdam to the south, and Cass to the west. The project was intended to bring together the services of Amtrak, DDOT, SMART, M-1 Rail (later QLine) streetcars, and future proposed services including the Woodward Avenue BRT and Ann Arbor-Detroit regional rail.  The first phase was completed in 2010 consisting of clearing the site and building a surface parking lot for the future station. MDOT announced in January 2016 that the department was also seeking to partner with developers to also include mixed-use development at the site.

Connections
Detroit Department of Transportation; 4, 16, 80, 89
Suburban Mobility Authority for Regional Transportation; FAST Woodward 461/462 (all day), 450/460, 445 (weekday peak periods), 465 (early morning northbound)

See also

Detroit People Mover
SEMCOG Commuter Rail (proposed)

References

External links

Detroit Amtrak Station & Former Michigan Central Depot (USA Rail Guide – Train Web)
Detroit MC Depot

1994 establishments in Michigan
2017 establishments in Michigan
Amtrak stations in Michigan
Tram stops of QLine
Railway stations in the United States opened in 1994
Railway stations in the United States opened in 2017
Railway stations in Detroit
Shore Line Subdivision